Río Grande District is one of eight districts of the province Condesuyos in Peru.

References